Aphyocypris dorsohorizontalis is a species of cyprinid in the genus Aphyocypris, native to Vietnam.

References

Cyprinidae
Fish of Vietnam
Cyprinid fish of Asia